Ramon Abulon Ilagan is a Filipino broadcaster, politician who served as the municipal mayor of Cainta from 2004 to 2013. He was once the overall spokesperson for United Nationalist Alliance, for the party itself and for former Vice President Jejomar Binay's 2016 presidential campaign.

Early life
Born to a mother who was a government hospital employee and a father who was a World War II veteran. Ilagan grew up in Barangay Tatalon, Quezon City. After finishing his public schooling at Tatalon Elementary School and Carlos Albert High School, he spent his youthful days as a choir member of the National Shrine of Our Lady of the Most Holy Rosary. He participated in various church activities of the Sto. Domingo Parish and he practiced the Dominican way of life following the vows of poverty, chastity and obedience. It was during this time when Fr. Sonny Ramirez, OP, asked Ilagan to work for him at Radio Veritas.

Career
Under the guidance and pastoral care of Fr. Ramirez, Mon Ilagan began his career in broadcasting while pursuing his college degree in Communication Arts at the University of Santo Tomas. He spent 25 years in the media industry, which turned out to be successful and was highlighted by prestigious awards such as the 1997 Reporter of the Year, the 2001 and 2003 Star Awards Best Morning Show Host for "Alas Singko Y Medya" and "Magandang Umaga, Pilipinas". He also taught as a professor at the ABS-CBN Center for Communication Arts.

Political life 

Since his first term, Mayor Ilagan and his team have made efforts to improve the general welfare of Cainta residents, transforming the municipality into one of the most prosperous municipalities in the country. However, he failed to do so and his incompetence to build proper infrastructure for flood-prevention was seen in the catastrophic results of the tragic Typhoon Ketsana in the municipality on 27 September 2009. As a public servant, Ilagan has received numerous awards, including a special citation from the United Nations for his program in support of "Stand Up and Take Action Against Poverty,"  the UST Arts and Letters Government Service Award in 2010, the 2008 CEO Excel Award (given by the International Association of Business Communicators), and the 2006 Most Supportive LGU Executive which was awarded by the Department of Health.

Continuing education remains a priority for Mon Ilagan. During his broadcasting years, he received a scholarship to the British Broadcasting Company in London as part of the Rotary Club International Foundation's Groups Study Exchange Program. He also attended local and international conferences and workshops to pursue the latest and best practices in disaster risk management and reduction. At present, he is pursuing a master's degree in Public Management at the Ateneo de Manila University School of Government.

Personal life
Ilagan credits his success to the providential guidance of his Christian God and the support he receives from his wife, Veron, and his four children, Ma. Anita Bernice, Ma. Charise Kaye, Jonah Paula and Dominique Frances.

References

External links 
 "Church Heroes of the Revolution", Radio Veritas. 23 February 2009.
 "A Neophyte Ousts Felix", Newsbreak: Independent Journalism. Public Trust Media Group, Inc. 5 July 2004.
 "Inquirer Editors Named UST AB Gantimpala Awardees", Inquirer.net. 2 March 2010.
 "Cainta Mayor Wins Top CEO Award", The Philippine Star, 16 March 2008.
 "Cainta to become first LGU Sentinel Asia member", The Daily Tribune, 5 March 2011.

Nationalist People's Coalition politicians
1960 births
Living people
Mayors of places in Rizal
People from Cainta
Filipino broadcasters
University of Santo Tomas alumni
ABS-CBN News and Current Affairs people